No. 221 Squadron was a Royal Air Force squadron that saw service in both the First and Second World Wars. Its motto was "From sea to sea".

History
The squadron was formed in Greece on 1 April 1918, from 'D' Squadron of No. 2 Wing RNAS. Initially engaged in anti-submarine warfare in the Aegean, it was sent to Russia in December 1918 to support White forces against the Bolsheviks. The unit was based at Petrovsk from January to 1 September 1919, when it was disbanded.

On 21 November 1940, No. 221 Squadron was reformed as part of Coastal Command. It flew Vickers Wellingtons on reconnaissance and anti-submarine patrols in the Atlantic, first out of England, then Northern Ireland and later Iceland. The squadron relocated to the Middle East in January 1942 and operated in the Mediterranean for the rest of the war, disbanding at Idku, Egypt on 21 August 1945.

See also
List of Royal Air Force aircraft squadrons

References

External links

RAF Squadron website
RAF Squadron history
Air of Authority Squadron history

221
Military units and formations established in 1918
Military units and formations disestablished in 1945
1918 establishments in Greece